Staraya is a rural locality (a village) in Florishchinskoye Rural Settlement, Kolchuginsky District, Vladimir Oblast, Russia. The population was 13 as of 2010. There are 3 streets.

Geography 
Staraya is located 16 km southwest of Kolchugino (the district's administrative centre) by road. Zherdevo is the nearest rural locality.

References 

Rural localities in Kolchuginsky District